Joshua Benjamin Trank (born February 19, 1984) is an American retired film director, screenwriter, and film editor. He is known for directing the found-footage sci-fi thriller film Chronicle (2012), the superhero film Fantastic Four (2015), and the Al Capone biographical film Capone (2020).

Early life 
Josh Trank was born in Los Angeles to school teacher Pamela Trank and filmmaker Richard Trank. He also has a younger sister and is Jewish. He spent much of his childhood scanning Hollywood and enjoying the sights it had to offer. When Trank was 13, his parents divorced and later his father remarried to comedian Judy Toll, who later died from skin cancer. He was initially uncomfortable with her, but they ultimately bonded when Toll pushed him into entertainment when she invited him to perform with The Groundlings. "[The] experience, changed me...I think about her still, like, every day, and I miss her tremendously."

In 2020, he revealed that he had been sexually abused several times when he was between five and six years old, which later in life gave him problems like anger issues, before he began therapy.

Career 
During an interview with Kevin Smith on the podcast Fatman on Batman, Trank discussed the origins of his career at length. He attributed his YouTube video "Stabbing at Leia's 22nd Birthday", which became very popular overnight after its release, as a significant breakthrough point for his career. Following this, Trank wrote and directed spin-off webisodes for the 2007 Spike TV drama miniseries The Kill Point. In 2009, Trank edited the independent film Big Fan, starring Patton Oswalt. He was also credited as a co-producer and had a small acting role in the film.

In 2011, Trank directed his first feature film, Chronicle. It was released on February 3, 2012, by 20th Century Fox and has grossed over $125 million worldwide. Chronicle, made for a budget of $12 million, was received positively by critics, earning an 85% score on Rotten Tomatoes. With Chronicle released at the age of 27, Trank became the youngest director to open a film at number one at the US box office. He is followed by Steven Spielberg (28, with Jaws) and James Cameron (30, with The Terminator). After the release of Chronicle, Trank was linked to Sony's Spider-Man spin-off Venom, Warner Bros.'s The Red Star, and Sony's film adaptation of the video game Shadow of the Colossus; however, Trank turned down those film projects, despite turning in a pitch of a R-rated film of Venom in the vein of The Mask that he wrote with his mentor Robert D. Siegel.

Trank directed the 2015 reboot of Fantastic Four, which was released in August 2015. The film flopped at the box office and was critically panned; it received a 9% rating on Rotten Tomatoes and a 27 out of 100 rating from Metacritic. Trank became the subject of controversy when he posted and quickly deleted a message on Twitter prior to the release of the film, apparently blaming the poor reviews on changes imposed by the studio, claiming to have originally cut a completely different film which would have been much better. Equally dissatisfied with the final film, actor Toby Kebbell, who worked with Trank on the film, supported Trank's claim. However, in early 2020, Trank admitted that there were several scenes he was unable to film, making a director's cut highly improbable.

In June 2014, it was announced that Trank would direct a stand-alone Star Wars film, but he left the project less than a year later. Trank indicated this was a personal decision, but several outlets stated that he was dismissed from the project due to issues during production of Fantastic Four, primarily a lack of communication with the film's producers, and that Lucasfilm had decided to pursue another director. Trank told the Los Angeles Times in an interview that the reason he left the film was because he wanted to do something original and smaller-scale, due to the amount of online scrutiny he received during the filming of Fantastic Four.

In 2020, following a five-year hiatus from directing, Trank wrote and directed his original Al Capone biopic Capone, with Tom Hardy starring. It was released through video on demand on May 12, 2020, receiving mixed reviews from critics.

In May 2020, it was announced that Trank was developing a television series about the CIA, with Hardy starring.

Style 
Trank has mentioned that he is interested in a deconstruction approach in his movies; "the deconstruction of myth, the deconstruction of iconic figures, the deconstruction of mythic ideas".

Personal life 
Trank was born in Los Angeles and is a 2002 graduate of Beverly Hills High School. In early October 2013, he married screenwriter Krystin Ver Linden; they divorced in 2017, which Trank implied was the result of his depression, attributed to the failure of Fantastic Four. His father, Richard Trank, is a documentary filmmaker and Academy Award winner. He deleted his Twitter and Instagram accounts in June 2020.

Filmography 

Acting credits

Other credits

Awards and nominations

References

External links 

1984 births
American male screenwriters
American television directors
2015 controversies
2015 controversies in the United States
Action film directors
Jewish American screenwriters
Living people
Writers from Los Angeles
Film directors from Los Angeles
Screenwriters from California
American film editors
21st-century American Jews